The Zire 72 is Palm, Inc.'s second Personal Digital Assistant with an integrated digital camera. Introduced in 2004, it is the replacement for the Zire 71, having a 1.2 megapixel camera, 32 MB of memory, built-in Bluetooth wireless communication, video recording and playback capability, a built-in microphone, hi-res hi-color screen, SecureDigital smartcard slot, and a 312 MHz Intel PXA270 processor.

Users have complained about several problems, most notably
Blue paint peels off (a "special edition" version has been released that has no blue paint, just silver.)
Camera quality (broken pixels, uncovered lens etc.)
Screen whining
Battery life

Palm, Inc. released a second version of the Zire 72, the Zire 72s, which is silver. This change fixed the problem with the paint. They subsequently released a version of the blue Zire 72, which used a different paint, and does not peel.

As with other Bluetooth enabled devices, turning that connectivity off when not required, extends battery life.

This is the last model in PalmOne's line of multimedia Zire devices, and the last model made with a camera. The Zire 72 has been discontinued and is no longer supported by PalmOne/Palm's successor, Hewlett-Packard.

There have also been many complaints about discolored pixels, such as certain groups of pixels on the screen turning green, red, and blue.

See also	 
Zire Handheld

Notes

References
Zire 72 review by Mobile Tech Reviews

External links
Product Support from Palm US Website

Palm OS devices